Maladministration is the actions of a government body which can be seen as causing an injustice. The law in the United Kingdom says Ombudsmen must investigate maladministration.

The definition of maladministration is wide and can include:

Delay
Incorrect action or failure to take any action
Failure to follow procedures or the law
Failure to provide information
Inadequate record-keeping
Failure to investigate
Failure to reply
Misleading or inaccurate statements
Inadequate liaison
Inadequate consultation
Broken promises

See also
 Administration (government)
 Public administration
 Public administration theory

References

 
 
 
 

Political terminology
United Kingdom administrative law
Public administration
Ombudsmen